Oppo Find X5 Series are Android-based smartphones manufactured by Oppo, succeeding the Find X3 Series. These phones were announced on 24 February 2022.

Design 
The Find X5 and Find X5 Pro use aluminium for the frame, while the display is protected by Corning Gorilla Glass Victus which is curved around the edges. The back panel is made from ceramic for the find X5 pro, and glass for the find X5, with a contoured camera protrusion housing three rear cameras and the dual-LED flash. The find x5 pro has IP68 water resistance unlike the find x5; colour options are Glaze Black and Ceramic White, Black and white respectively.

Specifications

Hardware 
The Find X5 and Find X5 Pro use the Snapdragon 888 and Snapdragon 8 Gen 1 processors respectively. Both devices offer UFS 3.1 with no expandable storage.The Find X5 has 128 GB or 256 GB paired with 8 GB or 12 GB of RAM, while the Find X5 Pro has 256 GB or 512 GB paired with 8 or 12 GB of RAM. Find X5 Pro has a 6.7-inch (170 mm) LTPO AMOLED display of 1440p resolution with an adaptive 120Hz refresh rate. The display has HDR10+ support, and is capable of showing over 1 billion colours. The Find X5 has also the same screen but with no LTPO tech, a smaller 6.55" screen and only 1080p resolution. Find X5 and Find X5 Pro battery capacity is 4800 mAh and 5000 mAh respectively; wired fast charging is supported at 80 W, and wireless charging at 30 W and 50 W respectively. Both phones include Dolby Atmos stereo speakers with active noise cancellation, and has no audio jack. Biometric options include an optical fingerprint scanner and facial recognition.

Camera 
The Find X5 and Find X5 Pro have identical camera hardware from Hasselblad and the MariSilicon X image processing CPU. The 50 MP Sony IMX766 is utilized for the wide and ultrawide sensors, featuring native 10-bit colour capture. The telephoto sensor has a 13 MP sensor with 2x optical zoom. A removed feature from the Find X3 series was a 3 MP microlens advertised with up to 60x magnification. The front camera remains unchanged, using a 32 MP sensor.

Software 
The Find X5 and Find X5 Pro run on ColorOS 12.1, which is based on Android 12.

References

External links
 

Find X5
Android (operating system) devices
Mobile phones introduced in 2022
Mobile phones with multiple rear cameras
Mobile phones with 4K video recording
Flagship smartphones